Warrant Officer Class One Glenn John Haughton,  (born May 1972) is a retired senior British Army soldier. In November 2018, he served as the Senior Enlisted Advisor to the Chiefs of Staff Committee until December 2021. He was previously the Army Sergeant Major, the most senior warrant officer and member of the other ranks in the British Army, from 2015 to 2018. He has also served as Regimental Sergeant Major of the 1st Battalion, Grenadier Guards and Academy Sergeant Major at the Royal Military Academy Sandhurst.

Early life and education
Haughton left school after taking his GCSEs at the age of 16 and joined the armed forces in 1988.

While serving in the army, Haughton completed an Extended Diploma in strategic management; this is a qualification equivalent to two A-Levels. Haughton holds a first class master's degree in business administration.

Military career

Early career

In 1988, Haughton joined the British Army as a guardsman in the Grenadier Guards. During his career he has served a number of overseas posting and was involved in a number of conflicts including the Gulf War, the War in Afghanistan, and the Iraq War. He was appointed Regimental Sergeant Major of the 1st Battalion Grenadier Guards in 2011. This meant he became the most senior soldier of the regiment.

In 2010, Haughton was selected for a Late Entry Commission (i.e. he was a senior serving soldier selected to become a commissioned officer). However, he was chosen to continue working as one of the army's most senior warrant officers rather than immediately take up the role of a staff officer. On 9 December 2013, he was commissioned into the British Army with the rank of captain but continued serving in the rank of warrant officer class 1. He was appointed academy sergeant major of the Royal Military Academy Sandhurst in January 2014.

Senior appointments

In January 2014, Haughton was appointed academy sergeant major, one of the most senior warrant officer appointments in the British Army.

In March 2015, he was appointed Army Sergeant Major, making him the most senior warrant officer/other ranks soldier in the British Army. As the Army Sergeant Major, he was the only soldier (and the first) to be a member of the Army Board.

On 1 November 2018, Haughton was appointed as the first Senior Enlisted Advisor to the Chiefs of Staff Committee. Although he continues to serve as a warrant officer class 1 in this position, he was promoted to major on 31 July 2019.

Personal life
Haughton is married and has two children. He left Twitter after claiming 'poor mental health as a result of trolling' after being publicly challenged over his record.
He was removed from post after having an affair with a Junior NCO's wife.

Honours and decorations
In January 2014, Haughton was awarded the Meritorious Service Medal for distinguished service. In the 2018 New Year Honours, he was appointed an Officer of the Order of the British Empire (OBE).

References

 

 
 

|-
 

1972 births
Living people
Grenadier Guards soldiers
Army Sergeant Majors
British Army personnel of the Gulf War
British Army personnel of the Iraq War
British Army personnel of the War in Afghanistan (2001–2021)
Recipients of the Meritorious Service Medal (United Kingdom)
Officers of the Order of the British Empire
Grenadier Guards officers